John Johansen (26 February 1883 – 15 October 1947) was a Norwegian sprinter.

Participating at the 1908 Summer Olympics, Johansen placed second in his first round 100 metres heat with a time of 11.7 seconds.  His loss to Robert Cloughen, who had run the course in 11.0 seconds, resulted in Johansen's elimination from competition. Johansen also competed in the javelin throw and freestyle javelin throw events, albeit with unknown results. He became Norwegian champion in 100 metres in 1906 and 1909. He represented IF Ørnulf in Kristiania and later SK Brage in Trondhjem.

References

Sources
 

1883 births
1947 deaths
Norwegian male sprinters
Athletes (track and field) at the 1908 Summer Olympics
Olympic athletes of Norway